Yoasobi (stylized in all caps) is a Japanese music superduo formed by Sony Music Entertainment Japan, composed of Vocaloid producer , and singer-songwriter .

After going viral on social media, Yoasobi's debut single, "Yoru ni Kakeru", gave them their breakthrough by reaching atop the Billboard Japan Hot 100 for six non-consecutive weeks and the 2020 year-end chart, and becoming the first song to be certified diamond for streaming by Recording Industry Association of Japan (RIAJ). It was followed by other successful singles, such as Blue Period-inspired "Gunjō", Beastars second season themes "Kaibutsu" and "Yasashii Suisei", and Mobile Suit Gundam: The Witch from Mercury opening theme "Shukufuku".

Yoasobi released four extended plays: two Japanese-language The Book and The Book 2 (both 2021), which both peaked at number two on the Oricon Albums Chart, and two English-language E-Side (2021) and E-Side 2 (2022). The duo has earned several accolades, including five Japan Gold Disc Awards, three Space Shower Music Awards, two MTV Video Music Awards Japan, a Japan Record Award, and a Noma Publishing Culture Award, among others.

History

2019–2021: Formation, "Yoru ni Kakeru" and The Book 

Both members of Yoasobi had active music careers before forming the duo. , a producer, songwriter, and former vocalist of rock band Davici, began using Vocaloid to produce songs. He uploaded his first song, "Sentensei Assault Girl", on the video hosting website Niconico in 2018 and gained popularity with his 2019 song "Last Resort". Then, he released his debut extended play Ghost City Tokyo in December of that year. , performing under the stage name Ikura in Yoasobi, is a singer-songwriter and a then-member of the cover group Plusonica from 2017 to 2021. She released her solo demo CD: 15 no Omoi (2016), and two EPs: Rerise (2018) and Jukebox (2019) through independent label After School.

After the discussion about vocalists, he found Ikura on Instagram, where she had uploaded some of her music, and formed the superduo. The duo's name Yoasobi originates from the Japanese word  (yoasobi), which means "nightlife", as a wish that they could take on various playful challenges by comparing their individual career to daytime and their Yoasobi career to nighttime. The duo uses the slogan "novel into music" to represent themselves.

The first song released by Yoasobi, "Yoru ni Kakeru", based on Mayo Hoshino's short story Thanatos no Yūwaku, published on Monogatary.com and won the Monocon 2019. The music video was initially uploaded via Ayase's YouTube channel on November 16, 2019, before subsequently being officially released on December 15. During the COVID-19 pandemic in Japan, the song went viral on social media as well as Ikura's The Home Take sole performance on YouTube, bringing it to top several music streaming service charts in Japan. Five months after its release, "Yoru ni Kakeru" ascended to number one on the Billboard Japan Hot 100 for the first time for three consecutive weeks and spent six weeks atop the chart. The single finished 2020 as the year's top Japan Hot 100 song, making it the first non-CD single to top the year-end chart. It also became the first diamond-certified song for streaming in Recording Industry Association of Japan (RIAJ) history. "Yoru ni Kakeru" won the Song of the Year at the 2020 MTV Video Music Awards Japan and the 2021 Space Shower Music Awards.

Following the debut single, Yoasobi released their second single "Ano Yume o Nazotte" on January 18, 2020. Like "Yoru ni Kakeru", the song also based on Monocon 2019-winning short story, Yume no Shizuku to Hoshi no Hana, written by Sōta Ishiki. The next song, "Halzion", based on Shunki Hashizume's Soredemo, Happy End, was released on May 11. It was marked as the first song collaborated with a professional novelist, whereas the first two were amateur writers, as a promotional project by Suntory to advertise energy drink branded Zone. In the second half of the year, they released the single, "Tabun", on July 20. It was based on the short story of the same name by Shinano, which won Yoasobi Contest Vol. 1. Inspired by the manga Blue Period and based on the brand's short story Ao o Mikata ni, "Gunjō" was released on September 1, to accompany Bourbon's Alfort Mini Chocolate advertisement. On December 18, the duo released "Haruka", a song based on screenwriter Osamu Suzuki's novel Tsuki Ōji.

On December 31, Yoasobi concluded the year at the 71st NHK Kōhaku Uta Gassen with their debut "Yoru ni Kakeru" performance as a duo at Kadokawa Culture Center. All singles released before preceded the duo's debut EP The Book, released on January 6, 2021. It was added three additional tracks, including "Encore", based on Kanami Minakami's Yoasobi Contest Vol. 1-winning Sekai no Owari to, Sayonara no Uta and used for Google Pixel 5, Pixel 4a (5G) advertisement. The EP debuted at number two on both the Oricon Albums Chart and the Billboard Japan Hot Albums, selling over 150,000 copies as of 2021. It topped the Oricon Digital Albums Chart for five consecutive weeks and the year-end chart with 100,000 downloads in 2021 alone, making it the only album to reach this milestone that year. The Book certified gold for both physical and digital release by RIAJ.

2021: The Book 2 and E-Side 

In November 2020, Yoasobi announced that they would handle theme songs for the second season of the Japanese anime series Beastars. Its opening theme "Kaibutsu", was released digitally on January 6, 2021, the same date as The Book, while its ending theme, "Yasashii Suisei", was released on the 20th. Both songs were based on the anime's writer Paru Itagaki's novels Jibun no Mune ni Jibun no Mimi o Oshi Atete and Shishiza Ryūseigun no Mama ni respectively. Later, the double A-side CD single of the themes was released on March 24, debuting at number two on the Oricon Singles Chart. "Kaibutsu" was ranked number five on American magazine Time 10 Best Songs of 2021, becoming the only Japanese act on it. The song won four awards for Song of the Year (Japan) and Best 5 Songs at the 36th Japan Gold Disc Award in both download and streaming categories.

The group's first livestream concert, Keep Out Theater, was held on February 14 at Shinjuku Milano-za former construction site for 40,000 online audiences. Yoasobi released "Mō Sukoshi Dake", a 2021 theme for the Fuji TV's morning show Mezamashi TV, on May 10. It was based on the Yoasobi Contest Vol.3 with Mezamashi TV-winning novel Meguru, written by Chiharu. A song for NTT Docomo's mobile network operator Ahamo commercial, "Sangenshoku", based on scriptwriter Yūichirō Komikado's RGB, was released on July 2. In June, Uniqlo's T-shirt brand UT partnered with Yoasobi to produced T-shirts with patterns inspired by the duo's song visuals. To promote the collaboration, they held the free livestream concert at Uniqlo City Tokyo, titled Sing Your World, and broadcast via the duo's official YouTube channel on July 4. It received 280,000 online viewers around the world.

On August 9, Yoasobi released the song "Loveletter", based on Hatsune's letter Ongaku-san e, which won the Letter Song Project, a contest held in 2020 by Tokyo FM's radio show owned by Japan Post Service, Sunday's Post. In the next month, the duo released "Taishō Roman" on September 15, based on Natsumi's novel Taishō Romance, won Yoasobi Contest Vol.2. Additionally in September, they were chosen to be a mascot for the 59th Sendenkaigi Award, an advertising award held by Sendenkaigi, and held an exhibition, titled Semiconductors Create New Realities, at Ginza Sony Park as part of Sony Park Exhibition. A theme of NHK's SDGs children's television series Hirogare! Irotoridori, "Tsubame", featuring children group Midories, was released on September 15, based on Nana Ototsuki's short story Chiisana Tsubame no Ōkina Yume.

Yoasobi's second EP, The Book 2, was released on December 1, preceded by the singles released in 2021, and "Moshi mo Inochi ga Egaketara", a soundtrack for Suzuki's 2021 stage of the same name and based on it. The EP debuted at number two on the Oricon Albums Chart, and atop the Billboard Japan Hot Albums. Additionally, it topped the Oricon Digital Albums Chart. The Book 2 was certified gold for physical release by the RIAJ. Yoasobi held their first face-to-face one-off concert since their debut in 2019, Nice to Meet You, at Nippon Budokan on December 4–5 for 14,000 offline audiences. The duo participated in the 72nd NHK Kōhaku Uta Gassen on December 31, performing "Gunjō" on the main show with orchestra, and "Tsubame" as part of a special show with Midories and two mascots from Hirogare! Irotoridori. 

Furthermore, Yoasobi started releasing English-language songs in 2021. The first English single, "Into the Night", translated from "Yoru ni Kakeru" by Konnie Aoki, was released on July 2. After that, they also released three other tracks: "RGB" and "Monster" in July, and "Blue" in October. All singles preceded the group's debut English-language EP E-Side, released digitally on November 12. The EP debuted atop the Oricon Digital Albums Chart, and number nine on the Billboard Japan Hot Albums. Yoasobi won two Artist of the Years at the 2021 MTV Video Music Awards Japan and the 2022 Space Shower Music Awards, and Special Achievement Award at the 63rd Japan Record Awards.

2022–present: Hajimete no series and E-Side 2 

In December 2021, Yoasobi announced a collaboration with four Naoki Prize-winning novelists to write and sing four songs based on the novelists' stories under the theme of "a story to read when you do [something] for the first time". The collaboration contains Rio Shimamoto's Watashi Dake no Shoyūsha, Mizuki Tsujimura's Yūrei, Miyuki Miyabe's Iro Chigai no Trump, and Eto Mori's Hikari no Tane. All novels were first published as a book, titled Hajimete no, on February 16, 2022, by Suirinsha. The first single of the project, "Mr.", based on Shimamoto's story, was released on the same day as the book published, and followed by the song based on Mori's novel "Suki da" on May 30. The third song was issued on November 18, titled "Umi no Manimani", based on Tsujimura's story. The final song, "Seventeen", which was based on Miyabe's novel, was previewed via the duo's campaign with Lawson's Machi Café in 2023.

In March, Yoasobi released several music projects in the meantime. The first was "Baka Majime", a collaboration with hip hop duo Creepy Nuts, released on March 20. The duo was credited as Ayase and Lilas Ikuta as the song was not based on a novel like Yoasobi's releases. It was followed by their first video album, The Film, slated on the 23rd, containing the duo's three concerts held in 2021 videos, and their enlarged version episode of the documentary program Jōnetsu Tairiku. Eventually, the "ballade" version of "Ano Yume o Nazotte", featured on CalorieMate's television advertisement 2021, Midnight Train, was released on the 30th, to accompany the Smash live action movie based on the novel of the same name that the song is based on.

Yoasobi partnered with Book Truck in July to launch a pop-up bookstore and café called Tabi Suru Honya-san Yoasobi-gō: Books & Café. In August, the duo participated in three Japanese annual music festivals for the first time: Rock in Japan Festival, Rising Sun Rock Festival, and Sweet Love Shower. The duo released the opening theme of the Japanese mecha anime series Mobile Suit Gundam: The Witch from Mercury, entitled "Shukufuku", on October 1 digitally, and November 9 physically. The song was based on the anime's writer Ichirō Ōkouchi's Yurikago no Hoshi. The duo released their second English-language EP E-Side 2 on November 18, preceded by "The Swallow", and "The Blessing" in the same month. Yoasobi perform overseas for the first time at 2022 Head in the Clouds music festival at Jakarta, Indonesia; and Manila, the Philippines in December. 

Yoasobi collaborated with Universal Studios Japan to write and sing a theme for the student support campaign called Unibaru in 2023, based on the novel that won the contest held by the campaign, under the theme "unforgettable memories in school age at the park". The result is the song "Adventure", based on Nagi's Lens Goshi no Kirameki o, released on February 15. The duo performed at the concert Unibaru! Live 2023 on March 11, including the debut performance of "Adventure". Yoasobi will be in charge of the opening theme of the anime Oshi no Ko, titled "Idol". They are scheduled to embark on their first concert tour, titled Denkosekka Arena Tour, in six cities throughout Japan, starting in Nagoya on April 5, and concluding in Saitama on June 4.

Members 

  – producer, songwriter
  – vocals

Band members

 Zacro Misohagi – keyboard chorus
 AssH – guitar
 Honogumo – drum
  – bass

Discography

Extended plays

Singles

Promotional singles

Videography

Music videos

Video albums

Concerts
Tour
 Denkosekka Arena Tour (2023)

One-off
 Keep Out Theater (2021)
 Sing Your World (2021)
 Nice to Meet You (2021)

Filmography

Television

Radio shows

Bibliography

 Yoasobi Novels: Yoru ni Kakeru (2020)
 Yume no Shizuku to Hoshi no Hana (2020)
 Haruka to Tsuki no Ōji-sama (2021)
 Taishō Roman Yoasobi "Taishō Roman" Original Novel (2021)
 Hajimete no (2022)

Awards and nominations

Notes

References

External links 
  

2019 establishments in Japan
Female-fronted musical groups
Japanese musical duos
Japanese pop music groups
Male–female musical duos
Musical groups established in 2019
Pop music duos
Pop music supergroups
Sony Music Entertainment Japan artists